Anville may refer to:

 Jean Baptiste Bourguignon d'Anville, an 18th-century geographical author
 Anville (crater), a crater on the Moon
 Anville, Charente, a commune in France